Taschen is a luxury art book publisher founded in 1980 by Benedikt Taschen in Cologne, Germany. As of January 2017, Taschen is co-managed by Benedikt and his eldest daughter, Marlene Taschen.

History

The company began as Taschen Comics, publishing Benedikt's comic collection. Taschen focuses on making lesser-seen art available to mainstream bookstores, including fetishistic imagery, queer art, historical erotica, pornography, and adult magazines (including multiple books with Playboy magazine). The firm has brought potentially controversial art into broader public view, publishing it alongside its more mainstream books of comics reprints, art photography, painting, design, fashion, advertising history, film, and architecture.

Taschen publications are available in a various sizes, from oversized tomes to small pocket-sized books. The company has also produced calendars, address books, and postcards sets.

In 1985, Taschen introduced the Basic Art series with an inaugural title on Salvador Dalí. Today's series comprises over 100 titles available in up to 30 languages, each about a separate artist, from classical to contemporary. Further series followed, alongside an expansion into new themes like architecture, design, film, and lifestyle. For example, the firm also publishes a "Basic Architecture" series in the same style as "Basic Art" that covers some of the most prominent architects in history.

Focus on male artists 
In the spring of 2014, the firm's Basic Art Series was criticized in Swedish public media for its focus on male artists. The series then consisted of 95 books, only five of which were female artists. Malmö Konsthall in Sweden was the first institution to report the disparity highlighted by the artists Ditte Ejlerskov and EvaMarie Lindahl.

The Helmut Newton SUMO 
In 1999, Taschen expanded to the luxury market with the Helmut Newton SUMO.

Signed and limited to 10,000 copies, the folio-sized publication quickly sold out. It later became the most expensive book published in the 20th century, with SUMO copy number 1 selling at auction for $304,000.

This book paved the way for Taschen's GOAT – Greatest Of All Time, an homage to Muhammad Ali, which Der Spiegel called "the biggest, heaviest, most radiant thing ever printed in the history of civilization."

Further Collector's Editions followed, including titles with Nobuyoshi Araki, Peter Beard, David Hockney, David LaChapelle, Sebastião Salgado, Annie Leibovitz and the Rolling Stones, often reaching ten times their original price within a few years.

Book series

Bibliotheca Universalis 
Taschen's Bibliotheca Universalis is a series of famous artworks in an affordable (about 15 euros) hardback format (14 x 19.5 cm). They are generally multilingual, with English, German and French texts and legends. Some books are also published in Spanish, Italian and Portuguese.

Taschen Basic Architecture 
Taschen Basic Architecture is a series of books on architects published by Taschen. Each book looks at a different architect, with a biography and pictures of their work.

Taschen Basic Art

Taschen's World Architecture 
This book series of 40 volumes, published in the 1990s, provided a comprehensive survey of architecture from antiquity to the present day.

Locations 
Through the mid-to-late 1990s, the company expanded by opening stores in other cities. Dedicated flagship Taschen bookstores, conceived in collaboration with artists and designers such as Albert Oehlen, Beatriz Milhazes, Jonas Wood, Marc Newson, Mark Grotjahn, Philippe Starck, and Toby Ziegler, are located in:

 Beverly Hills 
 Berlin 
 Brussels  
 Cologne
 Dallas (Taschen Library)   
 Hong Kong
 Los Angeles  
 London 
 Madrid
 Miami  
 Milan  
 New York City  
 Paris
 Vancouver

The firm has publishing offices in Berlin, Cologne, London, Paris, Los Angeles, and Hong Kong.

Between 2014 and 2018, Taschen owned and curated its own 6,000-square feet art gallery space in Los Angeles, featuring exhibitions on Michael Muller, Mick Rock, Ellen von Unwerth, and Albert Watson. The publishing house employs more than 250 staff members worldwide and many freelance editors.

General bibliography

Citations

External links 

 Official website

Book publishing companies of Germany
Companies based in Cologne
Companies based in North Rhine-Westphalia
Erotic photography
German brands
Mass media companies of Germany
Mass media in Cologne
Multinational companies headquartered in Germany
Multinational publishing companies
Privately held companies of Germany
Publishing companies established in 1980
Visual arts publishing companies